The Formula Renault 2.0 West European Cup (WEC) was a Formula Renault 2.0 championship that replaced the Championnat de France Formula Renault 2.0 as of 2008, though the series was folded in 2010.

The WEC extends the French championship to the Iberian Peninsula and Belgium, and is organized by the French Signature-Plus team, who previously organised the French series with the support of the RPM Racing. The series will be managed by Patrick Sinault.

As in French Formula Renault, the Challenger Cup will be kept, rewarding the best driver using 2004-spec cars.

French Formula Renault championship
The French Formula Renault championship was the Formula Renault 2.0 championship held on France between 1971 and 2007. It was the oldest Formula Renault championship.

The name of the championship change during years:
Critérium de Formule Renault (1971–1972)
Not held (1973–1974)
Championnat de France de Formule Renault Nationale (1975–1977)
Championnat de France Formule Renault (1978–1981)
Championnat de France Formule Renault Turbo (1982–1988)
Championnat de France Formule Renault (1989–1999)
Championnat de France Formule Renault 2000 (2000–2004)
Championnat de France de Formule Renault 2.0 (2005–2007)
From 2008 the French championship is included in the West European Cup, for French drivers only, with results from the races held in France, to decide the championship.

The Challenger Cup reward the best driver using 2004 cars.

The last round of the French championship was held outside France in the Circuit de Catalunya, Barcelona as symbol of the series expansion to Western Europe (Portugal, Spain, France and Belgium) in 2008.

Circuits 

  Algarve International Circuit (2009)
  Autodrome de Linas-Montlhéry (1971–1972)
  Bugatti Circuit (1971–1972, 1975–2006, 2008–2009)
  Circuit d'Albi (1971–1972, 1975–1993, 1996–2007)
  Circuit de Barcelona-Catalunya (1997, 2007–2009)
  Circuit de Charade (1971–1972, 1976–1999, 2002)
  Circuit de Croix-en-Ternois (1975, 1980, 1983–1992)
  Circuit de Folembray (1976–1977)
  Circuit de la Châtre (1971–1972, 1975, 1978–1983)
  Circuit de Lédenon (1977–1979, 1986–2007)
  Circuit de Nevers Magny-Cours (1971–1973, 1975–1987, 1989–2009)
  Circuit de Pau-Ville (1971–1972, 1975–2006, 2008–2009)
  Circuit de Spa-Francorchamps (1999, 2008–2009)
  Circuit du Val de Vienne (1993–2007)
  Circuit Paul Armagnac (1971–2009)
  Circuit Paul Ricard (1971–1972, 1975–1983, 1986–1990, 1992–1998)
  Circuit Ricardo Tormo (2000, 2008–2009)
  Circuit Zolder (1978–1982)
  Circuito del Jarama (1986, 1994)
  Circuito do Estoril (1987, 1999, 2001, 2008)
  Dijon-Prenois (1976–1981, 1984–1985, 1991–1994, 2002–2009)
  Donington Park (2003)
  Hockenheimring (1978, 1980)
  Imola Circuit (1976)
  Monza Circuit (1980, 1995, 1999)
  Nürburgring (1981)
  Rouen-Les-Essarts (1972, 1975–1978, 1980–1993)
  Vallelunga Circuit (1985)

Regulations
Practices session : 1 hour (or 2 x 30 minutes).
Qualifying : Two 20 minute sessions without refueling.
Races : Two individual races, the first between 60 and 80 km and the second lasting between 20 and 30 minutes.

Points are allocated as following :

In each race, 1 point was given for pole position and 1 for fastest lap. Only classified drivers were awarded points.

A Rookie classification was given if more than 6 drivers ran for the first time in the series.

Champions

References

External links
Formula Renault 2.0 WEC, championship official website.
renault-sport.fr, French Formula Renault official website.

Western Europe
Recurring sporting events established in 1971
Recurring sporting events disestablished in 2009
Auto racing series in France